Serpentine Prison is the debut solo studio album by Matt Berninger, lead singer and co-songwriter of The National, released on October 16, 2020. It was produced by Booker T. Jones and released on Book’s Records, a new imprint of Concord Records formed by Berninger and Jones.

Serpentine Prison was nominated for Best Recording Package at the 64th Annual Grammy Awards. The album was designed and art directed by Dale Doyle at Holotype, and painted by Michael Carson.

Background and recording
Berninger initially planned to release a covers album. Inspired by Willie Nelson's 1978 covers album Stardust, which was produced by Booker T. Jones, Berninger contacted Jones for assistance in making his own covers album. Berninger provided Jones with demos of covers and original songs, and eventually decided on an originals album. Four of the covers they recorded were released on the album's deluxe edition.

Serpentine Prison was recorded at Earthstar Creation Center in Venice, California. Additional recording was completed at Knobworld in Los Angeles; Silent Partner in Philadelphia; Cecelia's in Brooklyn; and Long Pond in the Hudson Valley, New York. The album is dedicated to Berninger's grandmother Elaine and to his college professor Gordon Salchow.

Release and promotion
Serpentine Prison was first announced by Berninger on Instagram on October 18, 2019, the day after he released his song "Walking on a String" featuring Phoebe Bridgers. The album was officially announced on May 20, 2020, with a scheduled release date for October 2, 2020. The album's title track was released the same day as a single. "Distant Axis" was released as a single on July 17, 2020. A third single, "One More Second", was released on September 10, 2020. The album's release date was pushed back to October 16, 2020. Berninger performed "One More Second" on The Late Show with Stephen Colbert on October 22, 2020.

A deluxe edition of the album, featuring four covers and two new original songs, was released digitally on March 12, 2021. The bonus tracks were previously only available on the limited-edition double vinyl issue of the album, which was released the same day as the standard edition. The four covers include The Velvet Underground's "European Son", Bettye Swann's "Then You Can Tell Me Goodbye", Morphine's "In Spite of Me", and Eddie Floyd's "Big Bird".

Critical reception

At Metacritic, which assigns a normalized rating out of 100 to reviews from mainstream critics, Serpentine Prison received an average score of 77 based on 20 reviews, indicating "generally favorable reviews". Candace McDuffie of Paste wrote, "Serpentine Prison displays infinite promise from an artist who has already given us a catalogue that has made a lasting impact on rock music as we know it."

Track listing

Personnel
Credits adapted from the album's liner notes.

Musicians
 Matt Berninger – vocals (all tracks), lyrics, melodies
 Booker T. Jones – Hammond B3 organ (tracks 1, 3–16), piano (tracks 2, 5, 6, 11, 12), electric piano (track 4), backing vocals (tracks 4, 11, 12, 14), bass (track 6), OP-1 synthesizer (track 11), electric guitar (tracks 13, 14)
 Scott Devendorf – bass (tracks 1, 3)
 Harrison Whitford – electric guitar (tracks 1, 3, 5, 8, 11, 14), lap steel guitar (track 1), acoustic guitar (tracks 2, 3, 6–10, 12, 13, 16), slide guitar (tracks 4, 9), bass (tracks 4, 5, 6, 10, 15)
 Andrew Bird – violin (tracks 2, 4, 6, 8, 9), loops (track 2), backing vocals (track 2)
 Sean O'Brien – lap steel guitar (tracks 2, 4, 7, 11, 14, 16), acoustic guitar (tracks 5, 6, 7, 10, 13, 15), gang vocals (track 9)
 Walter Martin – electric guitar (tracks 2, 4, 8, 11, 15), bass (tracks 2, 12), synthesizer (track 2), percussion (track 2), backing vocals (track 2)
 Hayden Desser – piano (tracks 1, 7), acoustic guitar (track 1)
 Matt Barrick – drums (all tracks), percussion (tracks 1–11, 13–16)
 Gail Ann Dorsey – lead vocals (track 5), backing vocals (tracks 3, 4, 6, 11–16), bass (track 1)
 Kyle Resnick – trumpet (tracks 4, 5, 7, 9–11, 14–16), backing vocals (tracks 6, 15)
 Jamie Heaslip – gang vocals (track 9)
 Mike Brewer – acoustic guitar (tracks 4, 15), bass (tracks 8, 11, 14, 16)
 Brent Knopf – piano (tracks 3, 9), guitars (track 9), synthesizer (track 9), backing vocals (track 9)
 Matt Sheehy – acoustic guitar (track 3), bass (track 9)
 Mickey Raphael – harmonica (tracks 4, 5, 9–11, 14–16), bass harmonica (track 6)
 Ben Lanz – trombone (tracks 4, 5, 7, 9–11, 14–16), bass (track 7), piano (track 16)
 Teddy Jones – electric guitar (tracks 13, 14)

Production
 Booker T. Jones – production (all tracks), arrangement (all tracks)
 Sean O'Brien – recording (all tracks), mixing (all tracks), additional production (all tracks)
 Matt Barrick – additional engineering
 Bella Blasko – additional engineering
 Walter Martin – additional engineering
 John X Volaitis – additional engineering

Art
 Dale Doyle – album design
 Michael Carson – artwork
 Chris Sgroi – photography
 Tom Berninger – photography

Charts

Weekly charts

Year-end charts

References

2020 debut albums
Albums produced by Booker T. Jones
Concord Records albums